Nail Kutluzhanovich Bakirov (30 March 1952 – 23 March 2010) was a prominent Russian statistician, professor and member of the Russian Academy of Sciences in Ufa, Russia, known for his work in asymptotic theory of mathematical statistics.

Bakirov was born in the city of Karaganda, Kazakhstan. His father had a doctorate in geology and worked for an oil company and his mother was an ophthalmologist. In 1969 he graduated from high school in his native Kazakhstan and was accepted at the Department of Mathematics and Mechanics at Moscow State University. He earned a doctoral degree from the St. Petersburg State University in 1979. Since 1974 his life was connected with Ufa. When the Ufa Mathematics Institute was founded in 1988, Bakirov became its member. Most of his research was devoted to probability theory and mathematical statistics.

Death
In 2010 he was killed when he was struck by an automobile while walking home from work in Ufa, Russia.

References

External links
  

Probability theorists
Russian statisticians
20th-century Russian mathematicians
21st-century Russian mathematicians
1952 births
2010 deaths